Scrobipalpula psilella is a moth of the family Gelechiidae. It is widely distributed throughout the Palaearctic region. It has also been recorded from North America.

The wingspan is 11–13 mm. Adults are on wing in August.

The larvae feed on Artemisia campestris, Artemisia maritima, Artemisia santonicum, Artemisia vulgaris, Aster alpinus, Aster amellus, Aster tripolium, Centaurea scabiosa, Erigeron acer, Gnaphalium species and Helichrysum arenarium. They  live on the ground in a tube of silk covered with dirt. The feeding causes a large, frass-free blotch in a low leaf. They may also bore in the stem of the host plant. Larvae can be found from May to June and again in September. They are green with a light grey head.

References

Moths described in 1854
Scrobipalpula
Moths of Europe
Moths of Asia